Gerhard Homuth (20 September 1914 – 2 August 1943) was a World War II Luftwaffe fighter ace. He scored all but two of his 63 victories against the Western Allies whilst flying the Messerschmitt Bf 109, and was one of the top scoring aces in the North African campaign.

Born in Kiel, Homuth grew up in the Weimar Republic. He joined the military service in the Reichsmarine before transferring to the Luftwaffe in 1935. Trained as a fighter pilot, he was posted Lehrgeschwader 2 (LG 2—2nd Demonstration Wing) where he flew with the aerobatics team. In October 1939, Homuth was posted Jagdgeschwader 27 (JG 27—27th Fighter Wing). In February 1940, he was appointed squadron leader of 3. Staffel (3rd squadron) of JG 27. He claimed his first aerial victory on 11 May 1940 during the Battle of France. In early 1941, his unit was transferred to North Africa where he was awarded the Knight's Cross of the Iron Cross on 14 June 1941 following his 22nd aerial victory. In June 1942, Homuth was appointed group commander of I. Gruppe (1st group) of JG 27. In late 1942, Homuth fell ill and was taken off operational flying. Following his convalesance, he served as an instructor for Bulgarian fighter pilots. On 1 August 1943, Homuth was given command of I. Gruppe of Jagdgeschwader 54 (JG 54—54th Fighter Wing) which was fighting on Eastern Front. The following day, he was posted as missing in action when he was shot down and likely killed in action near Kromy.

Early life and career
Homuth was born 20 September 1914 in Kiel, at the time in the Province of Schleswig-Holstein, a province of the Kingdom of Prussia. He joined the Reichsmarine before transferring to the Luftwaffe in 1935. In late 1938, I. (leichte Jagd) Gruppe, the light fighter group, of Lehrgeschwader 2 (LG 2—2nd Demonstration Wing) was created at Graz Airfield. With this Gruppe, Homuth was appointed chief of the Stabskompanie (staff company). Homuth had been a member of LG 2's aerobatics team which was equipped with the Bücker Bü 133 Jungmeister. The team's first public appearance was on 10 May 1938 on account of a demonstration to the Belgian Air Component at Arlon.

World War II
World War II in Europe began on Friday, 1 September 1939, when German forces invaded Poland. In preparation for the invasion, I.(J)/LG 2 had deployed to an airfield at Malzkow, present-day Malczkowo. The Gruppe supported the 4th Army as part of Army Group North.

On 1 October 1939, the new I. Gruppe (1st group) of Jagdgeschwader 27 (JG 27—27th Fighter Wing) was created at Münster-Handorf Airfield and placed under command of Hauptmann Helmut Riegel. Homuth was transferred and served as adjutant to Riegel, supporting him in the creation of the Gruppe. On 22 January 1940, the Gruppe moved to Krefeld Airfield where they were tasked with flying fighter protection during the "Phoney War" along the German – Belgian border. During this period, the pilots had little to no enemy contact. On 1 February, Homuth was appointed Staffelkapitän (squadron leader) of 3. Staffel of JG 27, replacing Oberleutnant Gerhard Rutsch in this capacity. In late March, I. Gruppe moved to an airfield at Mönchengladbach. In April, Homuth was briefly assigned to III. Gruppe of Jagdgeschwader 53 (JG 53—53rd Fighter Wing) which was commanded by Hauptmann Werner Mölders. Mölders' III./JG 53 was stationed further south on the German – French border and had already been engaged in aerial combat with Armée de l'air (French Air Force) and the Royal Air Force (RAF) of the British Expeditionary Force. The idea behind this assignment was to provide Homuth, and other Luftwaffe pilots, some combat experience.

Battle of France and Britain
On 10 May 1940, German forces launched the invasion of France and the Low Countries (Fall Gelb). At the start of the invasion, I. Gruppe of JG 27 was subordinated to the VIII. Fliegerkorps (8th Air Corps). The next day, Homuth claimed his first victory on 11 May, shooting down a Bristol Blenheim bomber in the late afternoon. That day, I. Gruppe operated in the area of Maastricht. The following day, 3. Staffel intercepted eight low flying Blenheim bombers on a mission to bomb the bridges crossing the Meuse and Albert Canal near Veldwezelt. Defending against this attack, Homuth shot down one of the Blenheim bombers. The next day, Homuth claimed a Hawker Hurricane fighter shot down. On 22 May, the Gruppe moved to Guise. Three days later, they were ordered to Saint-Omer for combat against the encircled Allied forces fighting in the Battle of Dunkirk. Prior to the relocation, Homuth shot down a Blenheim bomber, his fourth aerial victory. The Gruppe returned to Guise on 31 May.

The Gruppe predominately patrolled the area along the Somme on 1 and 2 June. On a combat air patrol to Dunkirk on 2 June, Homuth claimed two Supermarine Spitfire fighters shot down. On 5 June, German forces launched Fall Rot (Case Red), the second phase of the conquest of France. That day in the vicinity of Compiègne, Homuth claimed two Morane-Saulnier M.S.406 fighters shot down. One of the M.S.406 fighters may have been piloted by Sous lieutenant René Pomier Layrargues from Groupe de Chasse II/7, who was killed in action. Layrargues was the pilot who had shot down Hauptmann Werner Mölders from III. Gruppe of JG 53 that day and who was captured and taken prisoner of war. The Gruppe relocated again on 11 June, this time to an airfield near Soisson-Saconin-et-Breuil. On 14 June, Homuth claimed his last and ninth aerial victory of the Battle of France when he shot down a Bloch MB.131 bomber near Léchelle. When the Armistice of 22 June 1940 was signed, Homuth was one of the leading fighter pilots of I. Gruppe of JG 27. On 28 June, the Gruppe was ordered to Neuenlander Feld in Bremen for a brief period of rest and replenishment.

In preparation in what would become the Battle of Britain, I. Gruppe was moved to the English Channel on 2 July where they were based at an airfield near Plumetot. On 20 July, I. Gruppe escorted a number of Junkers Ju 87 dive bombers on a Kanalkampf mission against Convoy Bosom to the Isle of Purbeck. On this mission, Homuth claimed two Spitfire fighters shot down near Swanage. On 12 August, JG 27 escorted bombers to Portsmouth, claiming two aerial victories, including a Spitfire fighter by Homuth near Bembridge.

Invasion of Greece and North Africa

There, the pilots were sent on home leave, returning in January 1941. In February, the Gruppe began preparations for Operation Marita, the German invasion of Greece while the ground elements of the Gruppe began their relocation to Tripoli in North Africa, arriving there on 18 March. There, the ground crew began preparations for the air elements to arrive at the designated airfield at Ayn al-Ġazāla. In parallel, the air elements of I. Gruppe relocated to Munich-Riem Airfield in early March. Credited with fifteen aerial victories, Homuth was the leading fighter pilot of I. Gruppe at the time. There, the Gruppe received refurbished Messerschmitt Bf 109 E-7 fighter aircraft. The aircraft had been equipped with a sand-filter on the front of the supercharger intake which made the aircraft more suitable for deployment in North Africa. On 4 April, the Gruppe was ordered to move to Graz Airfield for Operation Marita. German forces launched the attack on 6 April. The orders for I. Gruppe that day were to attack and destroy the Yugoslavian air defenses in the area of  Laibach, present-day Ljubljana in Slovenia. Leading 3. Staffel, Homuth was given the order to attack the airfield at Laibach where they came under heavy anti-aircraft artillery fire. The Staffel attacked the hangars and inflicted damage on parked Potez 25 aircraft. Following Operation Marita, the air elements briefly returned to Munich-Riem before they transferred to North Africa, arriving in Ayn al-Ġazāla between 18 and 22 April 1941.

Homuth claimed his first aerial victory over North Africa on 1 May 1941. That day his Staffel escorted Ju 87 dive bombers on a bombing mission to Tobruk. The Luftwaffe force was intercepted by six Hurricane fighters near Tobruk. In this aerial engagement, the Luftwaffe claimed four aerial victories, including two Hurricanes by Homuth shot down taking his total to 17 aerial victories. On 5 May, then again on 8 May, Homuth shot down a Martin Maryland bomber, the latter claimed as a Blenheim bomber. On 15 May, British forces launched Operation Brevity aimed at the Axis front-line forces in the Sollum–Capuzzo–Bardia area of the border between Egypt and Libya. I. Gruppe was dispatched to the combat area near Sollum and the Halfaya Pass where Homuth claimed a Hurricane fighter shot down. Following two Blenheim bombers shot down near Fort Capuzzo on 21 May 1941, Homuth was awarded the Knight's Cross of the Iron Cross on 14 June for 22 aerial victories in total. He was the first recipient of the Knight's Cross within I. Gruppe of JG 27. On 14 September, German forces sent an armored reconnaissance mission to Sidi Barrani, approximately  into Egypt. The advance was repelled by British forces. Both sides committed aerial forces resulting in eight aerial victories claimed by I. Gruppe, including a Maryland bomber and Hurricane fighter by Homuth. On 9 February 1942, Homuth claimed his 40th aerial victory over a Hurricane fighter near Al Adm. Homuth was awarded the German Cross in Gold on 9 April.

Group commander and death
On 10 June 1942, Homuth was appointed Gruppenkommandeur (group commander) of I. Gruppe of JG 27. He replaced Major Eduard Neumann who had taken command of JG 27 as Geschwaderkommodore (wing commander). Command of 3. Staffel was then handed to Oberleutnant Hans-Joachim Marseille.

On 11 November, I. Gruppe was detached from JG 27 and ordered to return to Germany. Coinciding with the withdrawal from North Africa, Homuth fell seriously ill and was on convalescence until February 1943. Command of I. Gruppe then fell to Hauptmann Heinrich Setz who took command on 12 November. In February 1943, Homuth was posted to the Luftwaffe Command in Sofia where he led the training Bulgarian fighter pilots.

On 1 August 1943, Homuth was appointed Gruppenkommandeur of I. Gruppe of Jagdgeschwader 54 (JG 54—54th Fighter Wing). He replaced Oberleutnant Hans Götz who had temporarily led the Gruppe after its former commander Major Reinhard Seiler had been wounded in combat on 6 July. At the time, I. Gruppe was based at Karachev and was fighting in the Battle of Kursk on the Eastern Front. The following day, the Gruppe flew multiple combat missions in support of German ground forces retreating in the area north and northwest of Oryol. In the early afternoon, the Gruppe escorted Ju 87 dive bombers to the combat area near Kromy. Homuth failed to return from this mission and was posted missing in action. Command of the Gruppe was then again given to Götz who was killed in action two days later.

Summary of career

Aerial victory claims
According to Obermaier, Homuth was credited with 63 victories claimed in approximately 450 missions, 47 in Africa. He recorded two victories over the Eastern Front. Mathews and Foreman, authors of Luftwaffe Aces — Biographies and Victory Claims, researched the German Federal Archives and found records for 62 aerial victory claims, all of which claimed over the Western Allies on the Western Front or in North Africa.

Awards
 Knight's Cross of the Iron Cross on 14 June 1941 Oberleutnant and Staffelkapitän of the 3./Jagdgeschwader 27
 German Cross in Gold on 9 April 1942 as Oberleutnant in the I./Jagdgeschwader 27

Notes

References

Citations

Bibliography

 
 
 
 
 
 
 
 
 
 
 
 
 
 
 
 
 
 
 

1914 births
1943 deaths
Military personnel from Kiel
People from the Province of Schleswig-Holstein
German World War II flying aces
Aerobatic pilots
Recipients of the Gold German Cross
Recipients of the Knight's Cross of the Iron Cross
Luftwaffe personnel killed in World War II
Missing in action of World War II
Aerial disappearances of military personnel in action